In enzymology, an alanylphosphatidylglycerol synthase is an enzyme that catalyzes the chemical reaction

L-alanyl-tRNA + phosphatidylglycerol  tRNA + 3-O-L-alanyl-1-O-phosphatidylglycerol

Thus, the two substrates of this enzyme are L-alanyl-tRNA and phosphatidylglycerol, whereas its two products are tRNA and 3-O-L-alanyl-1-O-phosphatidylglycerol.

This enzyme belongs to the family of transferases, specifically the aminoacyltransferases.  The systematic name of this enzyme class is L-alanyl-tRNA:phosphatidylglycerol alanyltransferase. Other names in common use include O-alanylphosphatidylglycerol synthase, and alanyl phosphatidylglycerol synthetase.

References

 

EC 2.3.2
Enzymes of unknown structure